Wick in Caithness was a royal burgh that returned one commissioner to the Parliament of Scotland and to the Convention of Estates.

After the Acts of Union 1707, Wick, Dingwall, Dornoch, Kirkwall and Tain formed the Tain district of burghs, returning one member between them to the House of Commons of Great Britain.

List of burgh commissioners

 1661: William McBaith, merchant-burgess
1665 convention, 1667 convention, 1669–74: no representation
 1678 convention, 1681–82, 1685–86: Alexander Manson, merchant, bailie
 1690–1701: Sir Archibald Sinclair
 1702–07: Robert Fraser

See also
 List of constituencies in the Parliament of Scotland at the time of the Union

References
 Joseph Foster, Members of Parliament, Scotland (1882).

Constituencies of the Parliament of Scotland (to 1707)
Constituencies disestablished in 1707
Wick, Caithness
1707 disestablishments in Scotland
Politics of the county of Caithness